Paru Mahalleh-ye Mangelab (also Romanized as Pārū Maḩalleh-ye Mangelāb; also known as Pārū Maḩalleh) is a village in Bahnemir Rural District, Bahnemir District, Babolsar County, Mazandaran Province, Iran. At the 2006 census, its population was 193, in 53 families.

References 

Populated places in Babolsar County